Renato Capecchi (born Cairo, November 6, 1923; died Milan, June 30, 1998) was an Italian baritone, actor, and opera director.

He sang in the Italian premiere of Shostakovich's The Nose and Prokofiev's War and Peace, and in the world premieres of Gian Francesco Malipiero's La donna è mobile, Giorgio Federico Ghedini's Billy Budd and Lord Inferno, and Sylvano Bussotti's L'ispirazione.

In 1951, Capecchi made his New York Metropolitan Opera debut as Germont in La traviata and sang regularly in leading roles there until 1954. After a period of singing primarily in European opera houses, he returned to the Metropolitan Opera in 1975 where he specialized in smaller comic roles in otherwise tragic operas such the Sacristan in Tosca and Benoit and Alcindoro in La bohème.

Amongst the productions Capecchi directed were The Daughter of the Regiment at New York City Opera (1985), Così fan tutte in Susa, Italy (1978), and the US premiere of Giuseppe Gazzaniga's Don Giovanni Tenorio, ossia Il convitato di pietra with the San Francisco Opera Merola Opera Program, in Saratoga, California (1977).

Recordings are available of him as Figaro (Mozart and Rossini), Dandini, Riccardo, Rigoletto, Belfiore, Melitone, Ford, Jago, Scarpia, and, in an Italian translation-performance of Die Meistersinger von Nürnberg, Beckmesser. There is a DVD of Capecchi as Don Bartolo with Jennifer Larmore as Rosina in The Barber of Seville staged at Netherlands Opera in a 1992 production by Dario Fo.

Bibliography
 Erik Eriksson, 'Renato Capecchi', Classical Artist Biographies, All Media Guide, 2006. (accessed 7 November 2007)
Elizabeth Forbes, Obituary: Renato Capecchi, The Independent, July 13, 1998. (accessed 7 November 2007)
Allan Kozinn, 'Obituary: Renato Capecchi, The New York Times, July 4, 1998. (accessed 7 November 2007)
Metropolitan Opera Data Base. (accessed 7 November 2007)

References

External links
Interview with Renato Capecchi, October 3, 1986

1923 births
1998 deaths
Italian operatic baritones
20th-century Italian male opera singers
Italian expatriates in Egypt
Italian expatriates in the United States